Edma Trimolet (1801/2–1878) was a French painter.

Life 

Louise Agathe Edme Saunier was probably born in Chalon-sur-Saône in 1801. However, other sources say she was born in Lyon on 12 October 1802.

She became the wife and pupil of the Lyonnais painter Anthelme Trimolet. Under the influence of her husband, she favoured genre and interior scenes marked by the Troubadour style which flourished in the first half of the 19th-century within the Lyon School of painting. She also produced still-lifes.

She died in Saint-Martin-sous-Montaigu on 2 September 1878.

Art collection 
The remarkable collection of paintings and works of art, brought together by the couple from 1825, was bequeathed to the Musée des Beaux-Arts de Dijon, together with works by the two artists.

Works 

 Dijon: Kitchen Interior;
 ——— Still-lifes; 
 ——— Daydream;
 ——— sketch.

References

Citations

Bibliography 
 Oliver, Valerie Cassel, ed. (2011). "Trimolet, Edma maiden name: Saulnier". In Benezit Dictionary of Artists. Oxford University Press.

1800s births
1878 deaths
Year of birth uncertain
19th-century French women artists